Not to be confused with Al Diwaniyah.

Al-Qadisiyah Governorate, also known as Al-Diwaniyah Governorate ( ad-Dīwānīyah), is one of the governorates of Iraq.  It is in the center-south of the country. The estimated population of the province is about a million and a half million people, according to the census of 2014. Its capital is Al Diwaniyah. Before 1976, it was part of the ad-Diwāniyah Governorate, along with al-Muthannā and Najaf. The province is named after the historical city of Al-Qādisiyah, the site of the Battle of al-Qādisiyah, where in 636 CE the Islamic Rashidun forces defeated the forces of the Sassanid Empire. The governorate is predominantly Shia Arab. It includes the Mesopotamian marsh of Hor Aldelmj.

Education
There is one public university known as the University of Qadisiyah, which was founded in the late 1980s, and includes colleges such as nursing, pharmacy, law, literature, education, agriculture, medicine and others. The student population is mostly derived from districts and areas of the province and neighbouring provinces. The university is on the old road leading to the city of Hilla. The technical institute of Al-Qadisiyah is approximately 6 km from the city centre.

Provincial Government
 Governor: Sami Al Hasnawi
 Deputy Governor: Hussain Al Mosawi
 Provincial Council Chairman (PCC): Jubayyir Al Jubouri

Demographics

Districts
Hamza
Shamiya
Afak
Diwaniya

References

External links
Iraq Inter-Agency Information & Analysis Unit Reports, Maps and Assessments of Iraq's Governorates from the UN Inter-Agency Information & Analysis Unit

 
Governorates of Iraq